Alytus is a city with municipal rights in southern Lithuania. It is the capital of Alytus County. Its population in 2022 was 53,925. Alytus is the historical centre of the Dzūkija region. The city lies on the banks of the Nemunas River. The major roads linking Vilnius, Kaunas, Lazdijai (border with Poland), and Hrodna in Belarus pass through Alytus.

Divided onto two separate entities for centuries, it consists of two parts still frequently referred to as Alytus I and Alytus II, the earlier being a smaller town and the latter forming the city centre with parks, microdistricts and industrial areas.

Name
The name is derived from the Lithuanian hydronym Alytupis. In other languages the names of the town include Polish: Olita, German: Aliten, Russian: Олита Olita, Belarusian: Аліта Alita, Yiddish: אליטע Alite.

History

The first historical record of Alytus dates back to 1377, when it was mentioned in the Chronicles of Wigand of Marburg under the name of Aliten. According to the chronicle the spot was occupied by a small, wooden fortress guarding the Lithuanian frontier with the Teutonic Order. The fort and the surrounding village gradually grew, despite being frequently a target of raids of both the Lithuanians and the Teutons. The Treaty of Lake Melno left the town on the Teutonic side of the border, but it was retaken soon afterwards. On 15 June 1581 Grand Duke of Lithuania and King of Poland Stefan Batory granted the town the city rights based on the Magdeburg Law. The event is celebrated as the Alytus Day.

Until the Partitions of the Polish–Lithuanian Commonwealth the town was a part of the Trakai Voivodeship of the Grand Duchy of Lithuania and a notable center of commerce on the Nemunas River, serving as the main route for export goods from Lithuania proper. The town was also important as the place where one of the royal economic offices was located. In the third partition of Poland and Lithuania, in 1795, the town was divided between the Russian Empire and the Kingdom of Prussia. During the Napoleonic Wars, following the Treaty of Tilsit, the western part was ceded to the Duchy of Warsaw. After the Congress of Vienna it became part of the duchy's successor state, the Kingdom of Poland. Although the state was tied with a personal union with Russia, both parts of the town remained completely separate until the January Uprising of 1863. After that date, the autonomy of Poland was liquidated, but both parts of the town remained governed separately.

In the late 19th century the town was incorporated into a chain of Russian fortified garrisons along the border with East Prussia. It was tied with the rest of the world by a railway and a new road. In addition, the tsarist authorities constructed several barracks and an Eastern Orthodox church (in modern times converted to a Catholic church). However, despite the fortification effort by the Russians, during World War I the Central Powers managed to capture the town intact, without any major skirmish. In 1915 the town was incorporated into the so-called Ober Ost and both parts were once again united into a single administrative entity for the first time since 1795.

Following the end of World War I the area remained contested by newly independent Poland and Lithuania, with the actual control held by the German army stationed in the area. When the Germans withdrew in early 1919, the town was seized by the Red Army. On 12 February 1919, the town became a battlefield for the first skirmish between the Russians and the Lithuanian forces, which eventually took control over it. Since then the town has been a part of the Republic of Lithuania.

Following the invasion of Poland a large prisoner of war camp for Polish soldiers was established in the city. During World War II, Alytus was under German occupation from 22 June 1941 until 15 July 1944. Following the German occupation of the city in 1941, the camp was converted into a prison camp for Soviet soldiers (Stalag 343). The 1965 Soviet-era book Masinės žudynės Lietuvoje, 1941–1944 lists two major mass graves in Alytus: Vidzgiris forest, then at the southeastern suburbs on the left bank of the river, estimated 60,000 people, most likely Jews from the eastern Soviet Union, and the Alytus forest, then at the eastern suburbs, estimated 35,000 people, most probably Soviet prisoners of war. Historian Gintaras Lučinskas argues that these numbers were politicized and grossly inflated, and the actual number of victims is in single digits of thousands.

In 2015, a HVDC back-to-back station for the realization of a power interconnection between Poland and Lithuania (LitPol) was inaugurated west of Alytus. The facility built by ABB has a transmission capacity of 500 MW at a voltage of ±70 kV.

The coat of arms features a white rose, one of two coat of arms in the country that features roses. "The bridge of White Rose" is the country's largest pedestrian bridge, whose name was chosen by the citizens. The bridge was built on the remains of a railway bridge, which was blown up by the Russians when they were retreating back in 1915.

Climate
Alytus has a humid continental climate with quite large seasonal differences.

Culture

Alytaus Naujienos is a local newspaper in Alytus.

Alytus hosted the Art Strike Biennial between 18 and 24 August 2009 in response to Vilnius becoming European Capital of Culture for 2009. This included a demonstration and a three sided football match. The universal indoor Alytus Arena hosted the Eurobasket 2011 Group C matches in Alytus. In 2010 Alytus was awarded the Honourable Plate of the European Council.

Alytus has a museum dedicated to veterans of both the Afghan wars.

In Alytus, several Bonsai exhibitions were held with participants from European and other countries, such as Japan and the United States.

Alytus has hosted an annual Tomato tasting since 2007. Participants offer a wide variety of tomatoes and discuss the various factors which help produce a rich crop of the fruit. Alytus has an industrial company named Snaigė, which manufactures refrigerators.

Twin towns – sister cities

Alytus is twinned with:

 Amata, Latvia
 Berdychiv, Ukraine
 Botkyrka, Sweden
 Crawley, United Kingdom
 Ełk, Poland
 General San Martín, Argentina
 Giżycko County, Poland
 Hiratsuka, Japan
 Kremenchuk, Ukraine
 Mandal, Norway
 Næstved, Denmark
 Ningbo, China
 Opole, Poland
 Ostrołęka, Poland
 Rochester, United States
 Rouen, France
 Suwałki, Poland
 Vélizy-Villacoublay, France

The city was previously twinned with:
 Grodno, Belarus
 Lida, Belarus
 Petrozavodsk, Russia
 Smarhonʹ, Belarus

Notes

References

External links

 Alytus County Governor's Administration
 Alytus Municipality's site
 Alytus News Website
 Alytus Young Friend
 Interactive map of Alytus fortress
 The murder of the Jews of Alytus during World War II, at Yad Vashem website.

 
Capitals of Lithuanian counties
Cities in Alytus County
Cities in Lithuania
Holocaust locations in Lithuania
Municipalities administrative centres of Lithuania
Municipalities of Alytus County
Suwałki Governorate
Trakai Voivodeship